Everlight Radiology is a substantial provider of teleradiology services based in London and Australia.

The chief executive is Alexander van der Laan.

It was acquired by Teleradiology International, controlled by Intermediate Capital Group, in 2016.

The South Australian Government employed it to report on images at Lyell McEwin Hospital in 2016.

It ran Radiology Reporting Online  which secured part of a £3.8 million contract from NHS Scotland in 2017/8.  It won a contract for reporting at Mid Essex Hospital Services NHS Trust, Basildon and Thurrock University Hospitals NHS Foundation Trust and Southend University Hospital NHS Foundation Trust in April 2018.

As it employs radiologists in different time zones it can offer a 24-hour service cheaply.  It claims that more than 99% of reports are completed within 1 hour.

In 2021 it was reported as supporting 250 client sites across Australia, UK, New Zealand and the Republic of Ireland with a global network of about 500 radiologists and more than 300 support staff. It has regional bases in London, Leicester, Doncaster, Penzance and Belfast.

References

Radiology organizations
Private providers of NHS services
Health care companies of England